Giulian Pedone (born 29 November 1993 in Neuchâtel) is a Swiss motorcycle racer.

Career statistics

Grand Prix motorcycle racing

By season

Races by year
(key)

References

External links

1993 births
Living people
Swiss motorcycle racers
125cc World Championship riders
Moto3 World Championship riders
People from Neuchâtel
Sportspeople from the canton of Neuchâtel